Kurt Grünig (born 13 March 1944) is a Swiss footballer who played as an attacking midfielder. He made five appearances for the Switzerland national team from 1964 to 1967.

References

External links
 

1944 births
Living people
Swiss men's footballers
Association football midfielders
Switzerland international footballers
Swiss Super League players
FC Thun players
BSC Young Boys players
FC St. Gallen players
FC Zürich players
FC Winterthur players
People from Thun
Sportspeople from the canton of Bern